The Opera Quarterly is a peer reviewed academic journal of opera, founded in 1983. It is published by Oxford University Press.

The executive editor is Arman Schwartz of King's College London.

References

External links

Oxford University Press academic journals
Music journals
Publications established in 1983
1983 establishments in the United Kingdom